Ted Kroeber is an American film producer.

Filmography
 American Gun, (2005)
 Four Sheets to the Wind, (2007)
 Splinter, (2008)
 Larry Gaye: Renegade Male Flight Attendant, (2015)
 The Hollywood Masters, (2017)
 Traces, (2017)
 The Listening Party, (upcoming)

References

American film producers